Twin Fantasy (Face to Face) is the eleventh studio album by American indie rock band Car Seat Headrest, released on February 16, 2018. It is a complete full band re-recording and reworking of the band's sixth album, Twin Fantasy, by then-solo artist Will Toledo, released in 2011.

The CD release is bundled with the original 2011 album.

Background 
Twin Fantasy began as a solo album released by Car Seat Headrest's lead singer/songwriter Will Toledo on November 2, 2011. In an interview with CityBeat, Toledo explained that due to his lack of resources, Twin Fantasy was unable to achieve the expansiveness he originally wanted, adding that, "it just never seemed like the book was closed on it". He had initially considered a re-release, but after meeting with independent label Matador Records in 2015, Toledo decided to revisit the material in full, following the release of Teens of Style and Teens of Denial.

Recording and release
Recording for Twin Fantasy (Face to Face) began in 2016, with much of the instrumental work being recorded live at Soundhouse in Seattle. Vocals were recorded separately by engineer Adam Stilson at Decade Music Studios in Chicago. Post production and mixing took place between Decade Music Studios and Will Toledo's apartment, with most effects, stems and final mixes run through the studio's vintage mixing console. "Stop Smoking (We Love You)" was recorded by Toledo in his apartment.

On December 13, 2017, the band released a re-recorded version of "Beach Life-In-Death" digitally without prior announcement. Fans had hopes that the album would be re-recorded and released shortly afterwards. On December 27, 2017, an Amazon listing detailing a re-recorded version of Twin Fantasy was found by fans, and subsequently uploaded to the Car Seat Headrest subreddit. This was followed up by a listing on SRCVinyl.com with the date February 16, 2018, which contained an abridged version of the Matador Records press announcement.

On January 9, 2018, Matador officially announced the release of the re-recording, entitled Twin Fantasy (Face to Face), alongside a tour announcement and a music video for the single "Nervous Young Inhumans".. The album was released via Matador on February 16, as previously announced. The original recording, re-titled to Twin Fantasy (Mirror to Mirror), was released on vinyl as a part of Record Store Day on April 21.

Critical reception

Twin Fantasy (Face to Face) received critical acclaim from contemporary music critics. On the review aggregate site Metacritic, the album received a score of 87 out of 100 based on 21 reviews, indicating "universal acclaim." Hannah Vettese of Record Collector gave the album a perfect score, calling Toledo's lyrics "exhilarating" and described the album as "no stop-gap, contract filler of a record but rather a perfectionist giving a great album the full workout it deserved." The album received a "Best New Music" certification from Pitchfork, with Mark Richardson commenting that "Toledo pulls off an album with a jarring degree of specificity that touches on feelings familiar to almost anyone who has experienced young desire and heartbreak." In an "Album of the Day" feature for Bandcamp Daily, J. Edward Keyes described Twin Fantasy as "not only the best album in Toledo’s catalog, [but] one of the young year’s best rock albums, period," concluding that the result of the revisions, "is a blistering rock record of tremendous scope and heft, richly detailed and overflowing with memorable melodies. It is Car Seat Headrest’s first masterpiece." American Music journalist Robert Christgau gave the album an A−, stating that his favorite track was also the shortest, "Stop Smoking".

Track listing 

 "Cute Thing" contains elements of the They Might Be Giants song "Ana Ng", written by John Linnell and John Flansburgh

Personnel
Adapted from Bandcamp.

Car Seat Headrest
 Will Toledo
 Seth Dalby – bass
 Ethan Ives – guitar
 Andrew Katz – drums

Additional musicians
 Adam Stilson – various sounds
 Amanda Schiano di Cola – trumpet 
 Jeff Walker – trombone 
 Degnan Smith – acoustic guitars 

Featured performances
 Will Toledo – "the nonbeliever"
 Andrew Katz – "1traitdanger"
 Hojin "Stella" Jung – "the artist"
 Reesa Mallen – "Margot"

Production
 Will Toledo – production, mixing
 Adam Stilson – engineering, mixing
 Jason Ward – mastering

Charts

References

2018 albums
Car Seat Headrest albums
Matador Records albums
Concept albums